Querelle is a 1982 West German-French English-language arthouse film directed by Rainer Werner Fassbinder and starring Brad Davis, adapted from French author Jean Genet's 1947 novel Querelle of Brest. It was Fassbinder's last film, released shortly after his death at the age of 37.

Plot 

The plot centers on the handsome Belgian sailor Georges Querelle, who is also a thief and murderer. When his ship, Le Vengeur, arrives in Brest, he visits the Feria, a bar and brothel for sailors run by the Madame Lysiane, whose lover, Robert, is Querelle's brother. Querelle has a love/hate relationship with his brother: when they meet at La Feria, they embrace, but also punch one another slowly and repeatedly in the belly. Lysiane's husband Nono works behind the bar and also manages La Feria's underhanded affairs with the assistance of his friend, the corrupt police captain Mario.

Querelle makes a deal to sell opium to Nono. During the execution of the deal, he murders his accomplice Vic by slitting his throat.  After delivering the drugs, Querelle announces that he wants to sleep with Lysiane.  He knows that this means he will have to throw dice with Nono, who has the privilege of playing a game of chance with all of her prospective lovers. If Nono loses, the suitor is allowed to proceed with his affair. If the suitor loses, however, he must submit to anal sex with Nono first, according to Nono's maxim that "That way, I can say my wife only sleeps with arseholes." Querelle deliberately loses the game, allowing himself to be sodomized by Nono. When Nono gloats about Querelle's "loss" to Robert, who won his dice game, the brothers end up in a violent fight.  Later, Querelle becomes Lysiane's lover, and also has sex with Mario.

Luckily for Querelle, a builder, Gil, murders his work mate Theo, who had been harassing and sexually assaulting him.  Gil hides from the police in an abandoned prison, and Roger, who is in love with Gil, establishes contact between Querelle and Gil in the hopes that Querelle can help Gil flee. Querelle falls in love with Gil, who closely resembles his brother.  Gil returns his affections, but Querelle betrays Gil by tipping off the police. Querelle cleverly arranged it so that the murder of Vic is also blamed on Gil.

Querelle's superior, Lieutenant Seblon, is in love with Querelle, and constantly tries to prove his manliness to him. Seblon is aware that Querelle murdered Vic, but chooses to protect him.  Later, Seblon reveals his love and concern to a drunken Querelle, and they kiss and embrace before returning to Le Vengeur.

Cast 

 Brad Davis as Querelle
 Franco Nero as Lieutenant Seblon
 Jeanne Moreau as Lysiane
 Laurent Malet as Roger Bataille
 Hanno Pöschl as Robert / Gil
 Günther Kaufmann as Nono
 Burkhard Driest as Mario
 Roger Fritz as Marcellin
 Dieter Schidor as Vic Rivette
 Natja Brunckhorst as Paulette
 Werner Asam as Worker
 Axel Bauer as Worker
 Neil Bell as Theo
 Robert van Ackeren as Drunken legionnaire
 Wolf Gremm as Drunken legionnaire
 Frank Ripploh as Drunken legionnaire

Production 

According to Genet's biographer Edmund White, Querelle was originally going to be made by Werner Schroeter, with a scenario by Burkhard Driest, and produced by Dieter Schidor. However, Schidor could not find the money to finance a film by Schroeter, and therefore turned to other directors, including John Schlesinger and Sam Peckinpah, before finally settling on Fassbinder. Driest wrote a radically different script for Fassbinder, who then "took the linear narrative and jumbled it up". White quotes Schidor as saying "Fassbinder did something totally different, he took the words of Genet and tried to meditate on something other than the story. The story became totally unimportant for him. He also said publicly that the story was a sort of third-rate police story that wouldn't be worth making a movie about without putting a particular moral impact into it".

Schroeter had wanted to make a black and white film with amateur actors and location shots, but Fassbinder instead shot it with professional actors in a lurid, expressionist color, and on sets in the studio. Edmund White comments that the result is a film in which, "Everything is bathed in an artificial light and the architectural elements are all symbolic."

Soundtrack 

 Jeanne Moreau – "Each Man Kills the Things He Loves" (music by Peer Raben, lyrics from Oscar Wilde's poem "The Ballad of Reading Gaol")
 "Young and Joyful Bandit" (Music by Peer Raben, lyrics by Jeanne Moreau)

Both songs were nominated to the 1984 Razzie Awards for "Worst Original Song".

Release 
Querelle sold more than 100,000 tickets in the first three weeks after its release in Paris, the first time that a film with a gay theme had achieved such success. On review aggregator Rotten Tomatoes, which categorizes reviews as positive or negative only, the film has an approval rating of 57% calculated based on 14 critics comments. By comparison, with the same opinions being calculated using a weighted arithmetic mean, the rating is 6.10/10. Writing for The New York Times critic Vincent Canby noted that Querelle was "a mess...a detour that leads to a dead end."
Penny Ashbrook calls Querelle Fassbinder's "perfect epitaph: an intensely personal statement that is the most uncompromising portrayal of gay male sensibility to come from a major filmmaker." Edmund White considers Querelle the only film based on Genet's book that works, calling it "visually as artificial and menacing as Genet's prose." Genet, in discussion with Schidor, said that he had not seen the film, commenting "You can't smoke at the movies."

References

External links 
 
 
 

1982 films
1982 drama films
1982 LGBT-related films
German drama films
German LGBT-related films
French drama films
French LGBT-related films
West German films
English-language German films
Films directed by Rainer Werner Fassbinder
Films based on French novels
Films shot in Berlin
Films set in France
Films set in the 1940s
German serial killer films
English-language French films
Jean Genet
LGBT-related drama films
1980s English-language films
1980s French films
1980s German films